Friends That Break Your Heart is the fifth studio album by English singer-songwriter and producer James Blake. It was released by Republic Records and Polydor Records on 8 October 2021, after initially being scheduled for release on 10 September 2021 before being postponed due to delays in physical production as a result of the COVID-19 pandemic.

Critical reception

Accolades

Track listing

Notes
  signifies a co-producer
  signifies an additional producer
 "Life Is Not the Same" features background vocals by Joji
 "Coming Back" features additional vocals by Dominic Maker

Sample credits
 "Coming Back" contains samples of "Lake Shore Drive" by Aliotta Haynes Jeremiah.
 "Foot Forward" contains samples of "Frozen in the Night", written by Dan Hill and Barry Mann, as performed by Hill.

Personnel

Musicians 
 Jameela Jamil – additional arrangement (tracks 1, 3), structure (tracks 5, 7)
 Joji – background vocals (track 2)
 Dominic Maker – additional vocals (tracks 3, 6, 7)
 Khushi – additional arrangement (tracks 3, 6), additional vocals (track 6)
 Hal Ritson – additional piano (track 3), guitar (track 3), bass (track 3)
 Richard Adlam – additional programming (track 3)
 Rob Bisel – engineering (SZA; track 3)
 Tom Elmhirst – programming (track 3)
 James Blake – vocals (track 6, 11), keyboard (track 6), programming (track 6), drum programming (track 6), Wurlitzer (track 11), synthesizer (track 11), synth bass (track 11)
 Rick Nowels – Rhodes (track 11), Mellotron (track 11), acoustic guitars (track 11)
 John Christopher Fee – keyboards (track 11)
 Nico Muhly – string arrangement (track 12)
 Nathan Schram – viola (track 12)

Technical 
 James Blake – recording, mixing (tracks 1, 2, 4-7, 9, 10, 12)
 Take a Daytrip – mixing (track 2)
 Brad Bustamante – recording (track 3)
 Tom Elmhirst – mixing (tracks 3, 8); programming (track 8)
 Carl Bespolka – recording (track 6, 10)
 Khushi – recording (track 6)
 Tristan Hoogland – recording (track 7)
 Matt Scatchell – engineering for mix (track 8)
 John Christopher Fee – engineering (track 11)
 Dean Reid – mixing (track 11)
 Randy Merrill – mastering

Design 
 Miles Johnston – artwork
 Bradley Pinkerton – graphic design
 Matt Burnette-Lemon – package production

Charts

Release history

References

2021 albums
James Blake (musician) albums
Polydor Records albums
Republic Records albums
Albums produced by James Blake (musician)
Albums postponed due to the COVID-19 pandemic
Albums produced by Take a Daytrip